The abbreviation AALL may refer to
The American Association for Labor Legislation, an early advocacy group for national health insurance in the United States of America 
The American Association of Law Libraries
The Austrian Association for Legal Linguistics,  a scientific organisation investigating the relationship between language and law

See also 
Aall, a Norwegian surname
Aall (Norwegian family)